The Harrisburg Senators are a Minor League Baseball team of the Eastern League, and the Double-A affiliate of the Washington Nationals, in Harrisburg, Pennsylvania, who play their home games at FNB Field on City Island, which opened in 1987 and has a seating capacity of 6,187.

The "Senators" nickname refers to the host city being the state's capital and thus home of the Pennsylvania legislature. The team colors are red, navy blue, gold, and white, the same of the parent club, the Washington Nationals.

Harrisburg has won nine Eastern League titles and is the first team in league history to win four titles in a row: 1987, 1993, 1996, 1997, 1998, and 1999. The 1993 Senators were recognized as one of the 100 greatest minor league teams of all time.

Previous Harrisburg baseball history

The city of Harrisburg has a long history of professional baseball. The Harrisburg Base Ball Association existed as long ago as 1884 (according to a stock certificate issued on March 1, 1884). According to another source, in 1901, the first baseball club in Harrisburg was created. In 1912, Harrisburg won the first of three Tri-State Association championships in a row. In 1915, an affiliated International League team moved from Newark, New Jersey, to Harrisburg, Pennsylvania. The club lasted one year before moving to the New York State League and disbanding. This left the city without professional baseball for seven years.

In 1924, an incarnation of the Senators joined the newly formed New York–Penn League which was eventually renamed the Eastern League. Initially, the Senators and most of the other New York–Penn League teams were not affiliated with a Major League Baseball team. In 1927, the Senators started a five-year campaign with three Eastern league championships, winning titles in 1927, 1928, and 1931. The Senators' reign ended in 1936, when flood waters from the surrounding Susquehanna River ruined their home ballpark, Island Field.

Another team representing Harrisburg affiliated with the Pittsburgh Pirates formed four years later, though in the smaller Interstate League. Like the Senators before it, the team gained success quickly, winning the league title one year later. The success, however, was short-lived, as the team moved to nearby York in 1943. Another team affiliated with the Cleveland Indians was created, but was not as successful. The Interstate League disbanded this Harrisburg team in 1952, and any form of professional baseball was not played in the city for the next 35 years.

Modern franchise history

New England roots
The modern Harrisburg Senators originated in the New England states. First established in 1976 as an affiliate of the Milwaukee Brewers, the Berkshire Brewers played one season in Pittsfield, Massachusetts. After that season, they moved to Holyoke, Massachusetts, where they took the nickname the Millers.

In 1981, the franchise changed affiliations, moving from the Brewers to the California Angels. After the 1982 season, the team relocated to Nashua, New Hampshire, as the Nashua Angels. After the 1983 season, the team's affiliation changed again, this time to the Pittsburgh Pirates. The team changed its name then to the Nashua Pirates.

At the same time, during the mid-1980s, Harrisburg Mayor Stephen Reed initiated a revitalization plan that included a ballpark for a new Minor League Baseball team in the city. The Nashua Pirates relocated to Harrisburg and was rechristened the Senators on December 9, 1986.

The Senators
Like the original Senators, success was quick, winning the Eastern League championship in its very first season. In 1991, affiliation shifted from the Pittsburgh Pirates to the Montreal Expos, an affiliation continuing through that team's move to Washington, D.C., where they continued as the Washington Nationals. The first several years of affiliation with Montreal brought consecutive championships from 1996 to 1998. In 1999, the Senators played the Norwich Navigators for a shot at their record-setting fourth consecutive Eastern League championship. In the bottom of the ninth inning of game 5, the Senators trailed by 3 runs, but with 2 outs, the bases loaded, and a full count Milton Bradley hit a walk-off grand slam to right center field to win the fourth-straight championship for the Senators, an Eastern League first. In 2003, Sueng Song pitched the first no-hitter in modern Senators history.

Uniforms and logo
The official colors of the Harrisburg Senators are red, navy blue, metallic gold, and white. The home and away uniforms resemble those of the Washington Nationals, with a red cap for home games and navy blue for away. Both caps include the "H" and streaking baseball logo, with the "H" in the same script as the Nationals' pretzel-shaped "W." The white home jerseys include red and navy blue trim around the collar and sleeves with the "Senators" wordmark in red with metallic gold bevels and navy blue outline. The grey away jersey has navy blue and red trim around the collar and sleeves, with the "Harrisburg" wordmark in navy blue with metallic gold bevels and red outline. Both wordmarks are identical to the Nationals brand.

In 2007, the Senators added a unique logo to their brand, incorporating the prevalent and much reviled mayfly into the "H." Because of FNB Field's location on City Island in the Susquehanna River, thousands of mayflies are attracted to the ballpark's bright lights and die. The dead mayflies fall onto the fans below, obscuring their view.

Ownership
The city of Harrisburg paid $6.7 million in 1995 to acquire the team from the previous owners of the franchise, who were planning to move the team to a new taxpayer-financed ballpark in Springfield, Massachusetts. Instead of appeasing the desires of the ownership group with a new stadium, Harrisburg Mayor Stephen Reed led the city of Harrisburg to purchase the team instead. The previous owners had bought the team only six months earlier for just $4.1 million. Citing the ballpark as the major link in his downtown revitalization project, when asked how he could afford the hefty price tag, Mayor Reed responded by asking, "How could we not?" For a time, the Senators remained one of the only sports franchises in the United States to be completely owned by the community in which it was based. In 2006, the city put the team up for sale to combat a major budget deficit. Mayor Reed stipulated that the new owner must keep the team in Harrisburg for at least 29 years. The team was eventually bought by Senators Partners, LLC of Northbrook, Illinois, headed by Jerry Reinsdorf's son Michael, for an Eastern League record $13.25 million. Mark Butler, CEO of Ollie's Bargain Outlet, became the team's majority owner in March 2015, replacing Michael Reinsdorf who was principal owner and managing partner; the purchase price was not disclosed.

Triple-A franchise bid
In mid-2005, Peter Angelos, the owner of the Baltimore Orioles, gained the permission of the Double-A Eastern League and the Triple-A International League to move Baltimore's Triple-A affiliate from Ottawa, Ontario, Canada, to Harrisburg. One of the hangups with the agreement was that a buyer for the Double-A Senators franchise had to be found. The Ottawa franchise moved to Allentown, Pennsylvania, as the Triple-A team for the Philadelphia Phillies, renamed as the Lehigh Valley IronPigs. The Baltimore Orioles also signed a player development deal with the Norfolk Tides of the International League. The Tides became be the Triple-A affiliate of the Orioles.

Stadium renovation

FNB Field received a $32 million renovation ($19.1 million in state funding) in two stages. Originally the renovation was to begin in 2005; however, delays in state funding for the project were postponed until 2008, meaning the improvements were not implemented for Senators fans until the 2009 season, and the second stage was completed before the 2010 season.

Life Size Bobblehead Hall of Fame
In 2016, the Harrisburg Senators started a tradition by recognizing great players from their history in a unique way, The One & Only World-Famous, Life Size Bobblehead Hall of Fame. These enshrined Senators' legends will each receive their own life-size bobblehead. The life-size bobbleheads will be on permanent display at FNB Field with each bobblehead holding a commemorative plaque. The Senators plan to enshrine players yearly.

Broadcast
Every Harrisburg Senators ballgame is aired on 1460 the Ticket (AM 1460 WTKT – Clear Channel). Terry Byrom has been the voice of the Senators since 2005. The games are also streamed on the team's website. Some games are also aired on the local TV station, Comcast Network, and occasionally has games aired on MASN. The first radio play-by-play broadcaster for the Senators was Dan Kamal, who did the broadcasts from 1987 until the mid-1990s. Kamal at the time was also the radio voice of the Hershey Bears of the American Hockey League. He later was a TV analyst and studio host for the Atlanta Thrashers and then the Columbus Blue Jackets of the National Hockey League.

Roster

Team records

Season records
This is a partial list of the last seven seasons completed by the Senators. For the full season-by-season history, see List of Harrisburg Senators seasons

– in GB is behind, + in GB is ahead
Bold years are Eastern League Championship years
2020 season was canceled due to COVID-19 pandemic

Individual season records

References

External links
 
 Statistics from Baseball-Reference

Baseball teams established in 1987
Eastern League (1938–present) teams
Professional baseball teams in Pennsylvania
Senators
Pittsburgh Pirates minor league affiliates
Montreal Expos minor league affiliates
Washington Nationals minor league affiliates
1987 establishments in Pennsylvania
Double-A Northeast teams